The Dunfermline by-election may refer to:

 2006 Dunfermline and West Fife by-election, for the UK Parliament constituency
 2013 Dunfermline by-election, for the Scottish Parliament constituency